Giovanni Battista Venanzi (born 1628) was an Italian painter of the Baroque period.

Born in Pesaro, his first training was with Guido Reni in Bologna, then Simone Cantarini, then Benedetto Gennari. He painted a Descent of the Holy Ghost for the church of Saints Gervasius and Protasius in Bologna. He painted a Life of San Antonio for the church of San Antonio at Pesaro.

References

1628 births
17th-century Italian painters
Italian male painters
Italian Baroque painters
People from Pesaro
Year of death unknown